Ryan James McDonald (born 5 August 1984) is a Canadian actor from New Westminster, British Columbia, Canada. He is sometimes mistakenly credited as Ryan MacDonald. He is most noted for his performance in the film Black Conflux, for which he was a Canadian Screen Award nominee for Best Actor at the 8th Canadian Screen Awards.

Filmography

References

External links

1984 births
Living people
Canadian male film actors
Canadian male television actors
People from New Westminster
Male actors from British Columbia